Flavopunctelia lobulata is a species of foliose lichen in the family Parmeliaceae. Found in Argentina, it was described as a new species in 1987 by lichenologists John Alan Elix and Mónica Adler. It is similar in appearance to Flavopunctelia praesignis, but differs from that species in being terricolous rather than corticolous, and by its smaller thalli, which measure  in diameter. The specific epithet refers to its dense, somewhat erect lobulae (small lobes) in the centre of the thallus.

References

lobulata
Lichen species
Lichens described in 1987
Lichens of Argentina
Taxa named by John Alan Elix